Ajinkya is a given name. Notable people with the name include:

 Ajinkya Deo (born 1964), Indian actor
 Ajinkya Joshi (born 1986), Indian cricketer
 Ajinkya Rahane (born 1988), Indian cricketer

Indian masculine given names